The gray skink (Flexiseps ornaticeps) is a species of skink endemic to Madagascar.

References

Reptiles of Madagascar
Reptiles described in 1896
Flexiseps
Taxa named by George Albert Boulenger